The Golden Goblet Award for Best Documentary Film (Chinese: 金爵奖最佳纪录片) is a highest prize awarded to films in the documentary category of competition at the Shanghai International Film Festival.

Award Winners

References

Lists of films by award
Shanghai International Film Festival